Craske is an English surname. Notable people by that name include:

 Margaret Craske (1892–1990), English ballet dancer.
 Frederick Craske (born 1901), Bishop of Gibraltar from 1953 to 1959. 
 Leonard Craske (1880–1950), English sculptor. 
 Matthew Craske, art historian at Oxford Brookes University. 

English culture